Île Art – Waala Airport (also known as Belep Islands Airport) is an airport on the Art Island (Île d'Art)/Waala (on the Belep) in New Caledonia.

Airlines and destinations 

Airports in New Caledonia